Octarthria is a genus of flies in the family Stratiomyidae.

Species
Octarthria aberrans (Schiner, 1868)
Octarthria auricincta Kertész, 1923
Octarthria brunnipennis (Fuller, 1934)
Octarthria flavipalpis (Macquart, 1850)
Octarthria innoda (Hardy, 1932)
Octarthria minor (Fuller, 1934)

References

Stratiomyidae
Brachycera genera
Taxa named by Friedrich Moritz Brauer
Diptera of Australasia